The River Team is a tributary of the River Tyne in Gateshead, England.

Etymology
The name Team may have a Brittonic origin. The name may be from the Brittonic root tā-, with a sense of "melting, thawing, dissolving", plus a nasal root determinative, giving a form of *tā-m- or *tā-n-. However, Team has also been associated with the Indo-European *temhx-, "dark" and *tṃh-, "cut" or "be cut".

Course
Its source is near Annfield Plain, where it is known as Kyo Burn. Then changing its name again to Causey Burn as it flows underneath the famous Causey Arch. It then flows past Beamish Museum in County Durham (where it is known as Beamish Burn) then crosses the border into Gateshead flowing through Lamesley.   Continuing on into the Team Valley, the river flows through a culvert in the middle of the roundabout underneath the A1 road, it then continues through the Team Valley Trading Estate through a covered culvert, before emerging to the surface halfway along.

It then flows through the site of the 1990 National Garden Festival, before finally discharging into the River Tyne in Dunston. This area is known as Teams, after the river.

Pollution
The River Team has long been regarded as one of the most polluted rivers in the area due to the discharges from Sewage works near Lamesley and heavy industry in the Team Valley. It is called "The Gut" by the residents of Dunston. However considerable improvements have now been made and the river is relatively clean.

Water quality
The Environment Agency measure water quality of the river systems in England. Each is given an overall ecological status, which may be one of five levels: high, good, moderate, poor and bad. There are several components that are used to determine this, including biological status, which looks at the quantity and varieties of invertebrates, angiosperms and fish. Chemical status, which compares the concentrations of various chemicals against known safe concentrations, is rated good or fail.

Water quality of the River Team in 2019:

Geology
Prior to the last ice age, the lower part of the River Team actually formed the lower part of the River Wear, with a combined Tyne-Wear river continuing to the coast from Dunston.   The ice diverted the River Wear to its current course towards the coast at Sunderland, with the smaller River Team flowing along its former course towards the River Tyne.

References

 The River Team Corridor Project
 Reviving the River Team

Team
Team River
1Team